José Manuel Martínez Toral, simply Manolo (born 29 October 1960 in Caravaca, Region of Murcia), is a Spanish retired footballer.

Career 
The defender played a single cap for the Spain national football team and played for the Spain national under-20 football team football team, the 1979 FIFA World Youth Championship in Japan.

Honours
Barcelona
UEFA Cup Winners' Cup: 1978–79, 1981–82
Spanish League: 1984–85
Spanish Cup: 1980–81, 1982–83, 1987–88
Spanish Superup: 1983
Spanish League Cup: 1982–83, 1985–86

Personal life 
His son José Manel (born 1992) is a soccer player for the VCU Rams men's soccer team and for National Premier Soccer League side RVA Football Club.

References

External links
 

1960 births
Living people
People from Caravaca de la Cruz
Spanish footballers
Footballers from the Region of Murcia
Association football defenders
La Liga players
Segunda División players
Segunda División B players
Tercera División players
FC Barcelona Atlètic players
FC Barcelona players
Real Murcia players
Granada CF footballers
CE Premià players
Spain youth international footballers
Spain under-21 international footballers
Spain under-23 international footballers
Spain amateur international footballers